Paraguano is a small bay and beach in Corsica, France. It is a recreational spot for hiking.

References

Further reading

Bays of Metropolitan France
Landforms of Corsica